Indalur is a village in the Thanjavur taluk of Thanjavur district, Tamil Nadu, India.

Landmarks 
Two rivers namely "Kallanai Kaalvaai" and " Vennar" are located in Indalur. There is a very famous Karuppu Swamy Kovil. There are nearly about 10 temples around there.

Demographics 

According to the latest 2011 census, Indalur has a population of 1862 divided into 474 families. Male population is 912 and that of female is 950. Indalur has an average literacy rate of 75.59 percent, lower than state average of 80.09 percent, male literacy is 82.20 percent, and female literacy is 69.33 percent. In Indalur, total population of 178 is under 6 years of age. Out of the total population, 935 are engaged in work or business activity. 94.87 percent of the total population describe their work as their main job, 79 as cultivators and 588 agriculture labourers. The village is administrated by a Sarpanch.

Transportation 
The nearest railway station is Solagampatti (SGM). Frequent buses are available to Thanjavur, Thiruchhirappalli, Karur, Pudukkottai, Madurai, Chennai and Cochin.

References 

 

Villages in Thanjavur district